Phosphatidylinositol N-acetylglucosaminyltransferase subunit H is an enzyme that in humans is encoded by the PIGH gene. The PIGH gene is located on the reverse strand of chromosome 14 in humans, and is neighbored by TMEM229B.

This gene encodes an endoplasmic reticulum associated protein that is involved in glycosylphosphatidylinositol (GPI)-anchor biosynthesis. The GPI anchor is a glycolipid found on many blood cells and which serves to anchor proteins to the cell surface. The protein encoded by this gene is a subunit of the GPI N-acetylglucosaminyl (GlcNAc) transferase that transfers GlcNAc to phosphatidylinositol (PI) on the cytoplasmic side of the endoplasmic reticulum.

Interactions
PIGH has been shown to interact with PIGQ.

References

Further reading